Ishmael Muhammad, (born in Albuquerque, New Mexico in 1964) is an American member of the Nation of Islam, and son of Elijah Muhammad and Tynnetta Muhammad. He is the Nation of Islam national assistant minister to Louis Farrakhan. In 1995, Muhammad was a speaker at the Million Man March.

Of Elijah Muhammad's 21 children, he is the eldest son of his mother Tynnetta Muhammad. He is the Student Minister at Mosque Maryam, the headquarters of the Nation of Islam (NOI). Muhammad is also a Council Member and "is sometimes considered the most likely successor" to Louis Farrakhan.

Muhammad was featured on the Nation of Islam's national stage at the 2013 Holy Day of Atonement event on October 20, at which Muhammad delivered the keynote address in place of Louis Farrakhan who was unable to attend due to illness. Farrakhan's selection of Muhammad to speak in his absence may shed light on the future direction of the group's leadership. He played a prominent role at the large-scale event accompanying the funeral of his mother in February 2015.

For several decades, Ishmael Muhammad lived in Cuernavaca, Mexico, focusing on religious study, before returning to the NOI headquarters in Chicago. It is speculated that he may become the next leader of the Nation of Islam.

References

Living people
Elijah Muhammad family
1964 births
Nation of Islam religious leaders
People from Cuernavaca
African-American religious leaders